Lili Blumenau (1912–1976) was an American fiber artist. She was a pivotal figure in the development of fiber arts and textile arts, particularly weaving, in the United States during the mid-part of the 20th century.

Early life and education 
Blumenau is a graduate of the Berlin Academy of Fine Arts, the Académie Scandinave in Paris, and was the first woman to graduate from the New York School of Textile Technology.

Work and career 
After her education, Blumenau went on to become an instructor in several schools in New York City including Columbia University's Teacher's College, where she started a weaving workshop. She founded the weaving department at the Fashion Institute of Technology and Design in 1952. In addition to maintaining her own weaving studio on Tenth Street in Manhattan, she served as the curator of textiles at Cooper Union Museum from 1944 to 1950.

In 1955 Blumenau authored the text The Art and Craft of Hand Weaving, Including Fabric Design, which had a significant impact on her field. This text provided technical details and patterns for loom weaving as well as a conceptual approach to the methodologies of hand weaving as "engaging, fully-human, and life-giving". Her work provided inspiration to the Catholic Worker Movement, a collection of autonomous communities of Catholics to whom she taught weaving to several members at the Peter Maurin Farm.

Collections 
Lili Blumenau's works are in the permanent collection at the Cooper Hewitt Museum.

References

Additional sources 
Adams, Alice. "Lili Blumenau." Craft Horizons v.22, no. 2 (March 1962) p.16-20.
Blumenau, Lili. "Experiments in Sample Weaving." Craft Horizons v.17, no. 2 ( March 1957) p. 18-22.
"Lili Blumenau, 1912-1976." Craft Horizons v.37, no.1 (February 1977) p. 10.

American weavers
Women textile artists
1912 births
1976 deaths
American women artists
American artisans
Fashion Institute of Technology faculty
Cooper Union faculty
American writers
20th-century American women writers
Artists from New York City
20th-century American writers
American art educators
American expatriates in Germany
American expatriates in France